Harmony is an unincorporated community located within Jackson Township, in Ocean County, New Jersey, United States.

Harmony is located near exit 22 on Interstate 195 and is also located near County Route 526 (County Line Road). Originally the area was largely rural with a mix of farms, forest, and some houses along arterial road but by the late 1990s/early 2000s, housing developments were built and the area is now mostly suburban.

References

Jackson Township, New Jersey
Unincorporated communities in Ocean County, New Jersey
Unincorporated communities in New Jersey